The Kakching district of Manipur state in India has two subdivisions. It was created in 2016; at the time of the 2011 Census of India, it was a part of the Thoubal district.

Subdivisions 

The district has 2 subdivisions with 4 tehsils:

 Kakching subdivision: Kakching and Hiyanglam
 Waikhong subdivision: Waikhong and Sugnu

It has two community development blocks (CD blocks), each comprising several gram panchayats:

 Langmeidong CD Block:
 Arong Nongmaikhong
 Chairel
 Hiyanglam
 Langmeidong
 Mayenglamjao
 Pangantabi (PAngaltabi)
 Sekmaijin
 Waikhong
 Wangoo
 Kakching CD Block
 Hayel Hangoon
 Irengband
 Irong Chesaba
 Keirak
 Maibam Uchiwa
 Pallel
 Wabagai

Towns 

The district has three municipalities, of which Sugnu and Kakching Khunou were classified as Nagar Panchayats in the 2011 census, but are now administered by Municipal Councils.

Villages 

The Kakching district has following villages:

Kakching subdivision 

The following villages are listed in the 2011 census directory under the Kakching block of the Thoubal district, but are not listed on the Kakching district website:

 Laimanai (population 1484), now included in Nungoo Sanamahi
 Purul Tampak (population 0)

The following villages are not listed in the 2011 census directory:

 Kakching Khullen I
 Kakching Khullen II
 Kakching Khullen III
 Kakching Wairi I
 Kakching Wairi II
 Nungoo Sanamahi (including Tejpur and Laimanai)

Waikhong subdivision 

The following villages are not listed in the 2011 census directory:

 Purum Khullen
 Kakching Khunou I
 Kakching Khunou II
 Pumlen Pat

References 

Kakching